Bangkok University is a private university in Thailand.

Bangkok University may also refer to:

 Bangkok University Football Club, a former name of Bangkok United F.C.

See also 
List of universities in Bangkok
Bangkok Thonburi University
Navamindradhiraj University, formerly University of Bangkok Metropolis